The Tamworth Herald is a weekly tabloid newspaper published every Thursday in Tamworth, Staffordshire, England, with a cover price of £1.40. The newspaper covers events across Tamworth and south Staffordshire, as well as North Warwickshire. The Herald was named ‘Newspaper of the Year’  at the Midland Media Awards in 2015 and 2016. In November 2018 the Herald celebrated its 150th anniversary with a party in the Town Hall

History
The newspaper was founded as a broadsheet in 1868  by businessman Daniel Addison, and the original offices were based in Silver Street. A `flyer` introducing the weekly Tamworth Herald advertised as  a weekly newspaper for Tamworth with coverage of  surrounding districts of Fazeley Wilnecote Glascote Bolehall Polesworth Austrey Newton Clifton Hopwas Hints Wigginton Elford.
 
The first edition of the Tamworth Herald published on 8 August 1868 carried this advertisement on the front page....

Mr Addison continued to publish the paper for nine years until 29 October 1877, when it was taken over by a consortium of leading townsmen. The paper now has its offices on the town's Ventura Park industrial estate. Until the early 2000s, the Herald was published on a Friday, but the day of publication has now been switched to a Thursday. Three editions of the paper are currently published; one for Tamworth, and an edition each for Coleshill and Atherstone. Much of the content in all three is the same, although the front pages vary, concentrating on local issues in the different areas.

In November 2018 the Herald celebrated its 150th anniversary with a party in the Town Hall The Executive Editor Charlotte Hart and former assistant Editor John Harper gave video interviews on this historic occasion.      
As part of the 150th anniversary celebrations former assistant editor Jon Harper gave a talk on the history of the Herald in Tamworth. See picture of the Editors from the period 1999 to 2018 with other former staff.

The Herald is owned by Central Independent Newspapers. The CIN group owns a number of other news publications around the Midlands, including the Sutton Coldfield Observer. In 2012, Local World acquired CIN owner Northcliffe Media from Daily Mail & General Trust. In 2018 Trinity-Mirror became Reach plc.

Circulation 
Between January – December 2016 the Newspapers average weekly circulation was 11,333 copies across the Tamworth Herald, Atherstone Herald and Coleshill Herald titles.

Between January – December 2017 the Newspapers average weekly circulation was 9,955 copies across the Tamworth Herald, Atherstone Herald and Coleshill Herald titles.

Between January – December 2018 the Newspapers average weekly circulation was 8,084 copies across the Tamworth Herald, Atherstone Herald and Coleshill Herald titles.

Between January – December 2019 the Newspapers average weekly circulation was 6,411 copies across the Tamworth Herald, Atherstone Herald and Coleshill Herald titles.

Between January – December 2020 the Newspapers average weekly circulation was 4,723 copies across the Tamworth Herald, Atherstone Herald and Coleshill Herald titles. 

NOTE the ABC circulation auditors  ABC (Audit Bureau of Circulations UK) Only make the last years ABC report is publicly available. A subscription is required to access previous years reports.

NOTE The circulation shown is of Printed copies only. The Tamworth Herald also has an on-line offering as part of  Birmingham Live and a Facebook page with some 28,000 followers. This is a dynamic non-audited figure and only a general indicator.

See also
 Albert Christopher Addison

References

External links 
 

Publications established in 1868
Weekly newspapers published in the United Kingdom
1868 establishments in England
Newspapers published in Staffordshire
Tamworth, Staffordshire